Paul E. Dinello (born November 28, 1962) is an American comedian, actor, and writer, best known for his collaborations with Stephen Colbert and Amy Sedaris. He portrayed Geoffrey Jellineck  on Comedy Central's Strangers with Candy, and later became a writer and supervising producer for The Colbert Report and then The Late Show with Stephen Colbert.

Early life
Dinello was born in Oak Park, Illinois to Frank Anthony Dinello, the head of DePaul University's Mental Health Clinic, and Ann Lee Dinello (née Zeiler). He's the fourth of five siblings: Donna, Lori, Linda and David. His uncle Dan Dinello, who piqued his interest in directing, is an independent filmmaker and professor emeritus at Columbia College Chicago.

Dinello graduated from Oak Park River Forest High School and later attended DePaul University where he graduated from its College of Communications in 1985. He is also an alumnus of Chicago-based The Second City, Improv Institute, and Annoyance Theatre.

Career
In the late 1980s, he was hired to perform with Second City's touring company. It was there where he met Amy Sedaris and Stephen Colbert with whom he often collaborated later in his career. By their retelling, the three comedians did not get along at first – Dinello thought Colbert was uptight, pretentious and cold, while Colbert thought of Dinello as "a semi-literate thug" – but the trio became close friends while touring together, discovering that they shared a similar comic sensibility.

When he and Sedaris were offered the opportunity to create a television series for HBO Downtown Productions, Colbert left The Second City and moved to New York to work with them on the sketch comedy show Exit 57. The series debuted on Comedy Central in 1995 and aired through 1996. Although it lasted for only 12 episodes, the show received favorable reviews and was nominated for five CableACE Awards in 1995, in categories including best writing, performance, and comedy series.

A few years later, Dinello worked again with Sedaris and Colbert to develop Strangers with Candy. Comedy Central picked up the series in 1998.

Strangers with Candy was conceived of as a parody of after school specials, following the life of Jerri Blank, a 46-year-old dropout who returns to finish high school after 32 years of life on the street. Most noted by critics for its use of offensive humor, it concluded each episode by delivering to the audience a skewed, politically incorrect moral lesson. Dinello served as a main writer with Sedaris and Colbert, and portrayed Jerri's naïve and self-centered art teacher, Geoffrey Jellineck, seen throughout the series not actually teaching anything to his classes. Dinello took inspiration for his character from a teacher he used to have in high school.

Thirty episodes of Strangers with Candy were made, which aired on Comedy Central in 1999 and 2000. Though its ratings were not remarkable during its initial run, it has been characterized as a cult show with a small but dedicated audience. Dinello reprised his role for a film adaptation, which premiered at the Sundance Film Festival in 2005 and had a limited release in 2006. The film received mixed reviews. Dinello directed and produced the film as well as co-wrote the screenplay with Sedaris and Colbert.

Since 2005 until the show's end in 2014, Dinello worked as a writer and supervising producer for The Colbert Report. He made some appearances as Tad, the building manager. The character often is berated by Colbert, who forces him to do dangerous things.

In 2015, along with the rest of The Colbert Report crew, he moved to The Late Show with Stephen Colbert working as a writer and supervising producer. He sometimes appears on camera helping Colbert with some of the show's segments or on the cold open sketches.

In 2017, he co-created the craft-oriented comedy At Home with Amy Sedaris.

Directing and writing career
In 2003, Dinello co-wrote the novel Wigfield with Sedaris and Colbert, which they promoted by creating a traveling play.

Dinello directed the Nickelodeon original movie Gym Teacher: The Movie, starring Christopher Meloni and Sedaris.

With Sedaris, Dinello co-wrote Simple Times: Crafts for Poor People, published in 2010. He can be seen with Sedaris in the "Mummified Hand" episode of the Science Channel show Oddities.

Influences
Dinello has said his creative influences include comedians Ernie Kovacs, Buster Keaton, Peter Sellers and Monty Python; filmmakers Jean-Pierre Jeunet, Terry Gilliam, Federico Fellini; and photographers: Diane Arbus and Mary Ellen Mark.

Personal life
Dinello dated his Strangers with Candy co-star Amy Sedaris for eight years after they met at Second City.

Dinello met his wife, photographer Danielle St. Laurent, while working on the artwork for the book Simple Times: Crafts for Poor People. They got married in 2011. The ceremony was officiated by his long-time friend Stephen Colbert, for whom he had served as best man. The couple has two sons. Sedaris is their godmother.

Filmography

Published works
 Colbert, Dinello, Sedaris. Wigfield: The Can-Do Town That Just May Not (Hyperion, May 19, 2004) 
 I Am America (And So Can You!) (Grand Central Publishing; October 9, 2007) 
 Sedaris & Dinello. Simple Times: Crafts for Poor People (Grand Central Publishing, November 2, 2010)

References

External links

1962 births
21st-century American comedians
21st-century American male writers
21st-century American novelists
21st-century American screenwriters
Living people
American male comedians
American male film actors
American film directors
American male screenwriters
American comedy writers
American male television actors
American television directors
American television writers
DePaul University alumni
American male novelists
American male television writers
Primetime Emmy Award winners